Robert Ridgway (April 21, 1823 – October 16, 1870) was a nineteenth-century congressman, lawyer and journalist from Virginia.

Early and family life
Born in Lynchburg, Virginia, Ridgeway attended Emory and Henry College and graduated from the University of Virginia after studying law.

Career
Admitted to the Virginia bar, Ridgway began his legal practice in Liberty, Virginia (the Bedford county seat, which was incorporated in 1839 as a town, and renamed Bedford two decades after his death). He also was editor of the Bedford Sentinel. In 1850 Ridgeway lived in a boardinghouse in Amherst, the county seat of Amherst County, Virginia on the other side of Lynchburg, with the innkeeper's family and several clerks and a schoolmaster. In that census, he owned fifteen enslaved people, eight of them women (ranging from 65 and 56 years old to 16 and 12 year old girls) and seven men (ranging from 28 years old to 15, 12 and a 3 year old boy). In 1853, Ridgway moved to Richmond, Virginia and became the editor of the Richmond Whig. However, in 1860 he continued to own 10 slaves in Amherst County (two 70 year old women, women aged 25, 22 and 20, a 20 year old man, girls aged 7 and 2, and a 10 year old boy).

At the outbreak of the Civil War, Ridgeway returned to Amherst. However "Richard S. Ridgeway" enlisted as a private in Company D of the 6th Virginia Cavalry on April 18, 1861, then went AWOL in September and was discharged on December 23, 1861 based on a surgeon's certificate concerning hip damage in a railroad accident.

Shortly the war's end, in 1866, voters in Bedford, Amherst and nearby counties elected Ridgway as a Whig to the United States House of Representatives. However, fellow Congressmen did not permit him to be seated, because Virginia was still under Congressional Reconstruction and had not adopted a state constitution to replace the 1850 state constitution which allowed slavery. After Virginians ratified a new state constitution in 1869 (without its proposed bar on former Confederates holding office), voters in the 5th Congressional district elected Ridgway as a Conservative to the House, and he served from January 1870 until his death on October 16, 1870 in Amherst, Virginia. He appears in the 1870 census as living in Elon, Virginia, with his 86 year old mother Mary Ridgway as the head of household, and sisters Elizabeth, Harriet and Rhodie (aged 60, 50 and 48), as well as 44 year old Bettie Winston and 17 year old white servant Priscilla Gentry.

Death and legacy
Congressman Ridgway was interred in the family cemetery in Amherst.

See also
List of United States Congress members who died in office (1790–1899)

References

External links

1823 births
1870 deaths
Politicians from Lynchburg, Virginia
Virginia Whigs
Conservative Party of Virginia politicians
Conservative Party of Virginia members of the United States House of Representatives
Members of the United States House of Representatives from Virginia
Virginia lawyers
American newspaper editors
Emory and Henry College alumni
University of Virginia School of Law alumni
Politicians from Richmond, Virginia
19th-century American journalists
American male journalists
19th-century American male writers
19th-century American politicians
Journalists from Virginia
19th-century American lawyers